"Calling All Hearts" is a song by American producer DJ Cassidy, featuring vocals from American singer-songwriter, musician and actor Robin Thicke, and English singer-songwriter Jessie J. The song was released in the United States in February 2014 and in the United Kingdom on 20 April 2014 as a digital download. The song has charted in Belgium. The song was written by Cassidy Podell, Jessica Cornish, Claude Kelly and Gregory Cohen.

Music video
A music video to accompany the release of "Calling All Hearts" was first released onto YouTube on 4 March 2014 at a total length of six minutes and thirty-five seconds. The X-directed video was shot in London and features a 13-piece band, performing on a 52 square-foot pink lacquer heart-shaped stage. British singer Jessie J cozies up to Robin Thicke, while Cassidy rocks the CDJs in a lime green tuxedo jacket and his signature 1920s boater hat.

Track listing

Charts

Release history

References

2014 debut singles
2014 songs
Disco songs
DJ Cassidy songs
Jessie J songs
Robin Thicke songs
Columbia Records singles
Songs written by Jessie J
Songs written by Claude Kelly
Music videos directed by Director X
Male–female vocal duets